LGB may refer to:

Places
 La Grande Boissière, a campus of the International School of Geneva
 Long Beach Airport (IATA code LGB), California, US

Other uses
 The Larger Grain Borer (LGB), Prostephanus truncatus
 Laser-guided bomb
 Lectures on Government and Binding, a book by  Noam Chomsky
 "Lesbian, gay, and bisexual", later usually LGBT
 "Let's Go Brandon", a political slogan used since 2021, a euphemistic expression to replace "Fuck Joe Biden"
 LGB (trains) (Lehmann Gross Bahn), garden railroads 
 LGB Alliance
 Formula LGB, a racecar category
 Laghu language (ISO 639 code lgb)

See also

 
 LG8 (disambiguation)